The Center for Strategic Studies under the President of the Republic of Azerbaijan (SAM) is Azerbaijan’s first governmental, non-profit think tank founded on November 12, 2007 by the Decree of the President, Ilham Aliyev. Its headquarters is in Baku, Azerbaijan. In February 2008, by the Decree of the President of the Republic of Azerbaijan, Elkhan Nuriyev was appointed director of the Center for Strategic Studies, known by the acronym SAM in Azerbaijani language.

Departments
The Center for Strategic Studies is divided into main departments that help to carry out its objectives.

Domestic Policy Analysis Department 

This department conducts scientific and conceptual research on the domestic policies of the country, mechanisms for their implementation, existing problems in this area and their possible solution. The department conducts scientific research to determine, ensure and protect the social interests of Azerbaijan, and identifies important aspects of fundamental reforms within the country, studies the behavioral course of domestic political forces and the possible impact of these processes on the country's development.

Foreign Policy Analysis Department 

The department studies and conducts research on fundamental transformations happening within the framework of the international relations system, tracing the course of political behavior in the regional and political area and identifying the possible effects of these processes on the country. The department also deals with scientific and theoretical research on the foreign politics of the country, mechanisms for its implementation and existing problems in this sphere.

Economic Analysis and Global Affairs Department 

The main activity of the department is to monitor all events and trends in the Azerbaijani and global economy, carry out thorough research, analyze and make possible solutions and recommendations based on the results of conducted research. The research activity of the department is carried out several directions. They include: observation and analysis of economic processes in the country and on the international arena, as well as factors that assist Azerbaijan and other countries in the world develop economically. The aim of the department is to investigate factors that may affect economic processes, and on the basis of these studies, prepare various programs, theories and analytical documents.

International partners
German Institute for International and Security Affairs (Berlin)
London Information Network on Conflicts and State Building (London)
The International Institute for Strategic Studies (London)
Center for Strategic and International Studies (Washington, DC)
Central Asia-Caucasus Institute at Johns Hopkins University (Washington, DC)
French Institute of International Relations (Paris)
French Institute for International Relations and Strategic Studies (Paris)
Hudson Institute (Washington, DC)
Konrad Adenauer Foundation (Berlin)
Carnegie Moscow Center (Moscow)
Kazakhstan Institute for Strategic Studies under the President of Kazakhstan (Almaty)
Russia's Institute for Strategic Studies (Moscow)
Unity for Russia Foundation (Moscow)
Woodrow Wilson International Center for Scholars (Washington, DC)
German Council on Foreign Relations (Berlin)
Center for Energy, Marine Transportation and Public Policy, School of International and Public Affairs at Columbia University (New York)
SETA Foundation for Political, Economic, and Social Research (Ankara)
Center for European Policy Studies (Brussels)

Activities 
Over the past period, the SAM has prepared and presented a number of proposals and programs concerning public, political and economic processes in Azerbaijan as well as on the international arena. The priority directions for the activities of the center, and in particular the research of the SAM are the internal and external policy of the state, the conflict in Nagorno-Karabakh, the strategy of Azerbaijan regarding energy, oil and gas, the country's development at the economic and political levels, as well as the country's security issues.

International conferences, exhibitions, seminars and round tables also play an important role in the activities of the center. Thus, the following activities were carried out: "Security Barriers in the South Caucasus", "Azerbaijan and the Eastern Partnership", "Cyber and National Security", "Climate Change and Renewable Energy Sources in the Black Sea Region." In April 2012, members of the Organization of Islamic Cooperation.

In addition, the staff of the center participate in various foreign events, conferences and scientific forums. For example, a member of Foreign Policy Analysis Department, Azad Garibov participated at a meeting of the OSCE Ministerial Council in Ukraine held on December 5–6, 2013. He also participated in the 20th meeting of the OSCE Ministerial Council, the preparatory meeting of the Council, as well as at its plenary meeting. The SAM expert represented Azerbaijan in the process of discussion of "Helsinki +40" , which was devoted to the participation of the modern think tanks in the work of the OSCE.

The Center also invites world-famous politicians and experts as guests or speakers to their events. For example, Secretary of the US Secretary Richard Morningstar, President of Stratford Analytical Corporation George Friedman, Vice President of The Kohen Group Mark Grosman, Heritage Foundation expert Ariel Cohen, expert from the European Policy Center Amanda Paul, editor-in-chief of the magazine "Russia in global policy" F. Lukyanov, Director of the Center for Energy, Maritime Transport and Public Policy at Columbia University Albert Bressand, Director of the Center for Strategic Studies at the Foreign Ministry of Turkey Bulent Araz, doctor of the faculty politically Sciences of the University of Haifa Brenda Shaffer, President of the Jamestown Foundation Glen Howard, French Senator Nathalie Goulet et al. visited the Center for Strategic Studies under the Azerbaijani President.

Publications
As a result of its research and analysis, the SAM publishes journals and articles in both Azerbaijani and Russian and English. Such publications as "Azerbaijan Focus", "Strateji təhlil" (Eng. Strategic Analysis), "Analitik Baxış" (Eng. Analytical Outlook), "SAM-ın Icmalı" (Eng. SAM Review), "SAM-ın Şərhləri" (Eng. SAM Comments) and Caucasus International are provided to the public by the CSI along with political analyzes and forecasts from local and foreign experts. In 2016, one of the issues of the "SAM Comments" magazine, was devoted to the increase in the importance of the role of the OSCE. The issue named "The OSCE failure: from the regional security organization to the political tool", developed by the leading research officer of the Center for Contemporary Art, Kamal Makili-Aliyev, is discussing a number of topics, including the formation and development of the OSCE; peculiarities of institutional problems and factors that led to the failure of the OSCE as a regional security organization.

Azerbaijan Focus: Journal of International Affairs is a publication of the Center for Strategic Studies under the President of the Republic of Azerbaijan. Azerbaijan Focus is published in the Azerbaijani and English languages and is dedicated to analyzing modern processes underway in the Caucasus, Central Asia and the wider Black Sea-Caspian basin. The Editorial Council of the journal comprises Azerbaijani and foreign statesmen, renowned scholars of world politics and international expert opinion. The contributing authors include the most prominent Azerbaijani and foreign policymakers and leading experts in government, business and academic circles who are very familiar with the history and politics of the region.

Funding
SAM is funded by the Government of the Republic of Azerbaijan.

External links
 The protocols are signed, what’s next?. Today's Zaman, 17 October 2009
 Azerbaijan’s Strategic Role in Eurasian Pipeline Politics. Center for Strategic and International Studies, May 15, 2009
 Azerbaijan and the New Geopolitics of Eurasia: Foreign Policy Strategies, Caspian Energy Security, and Great Power Politics. Woodrow Wilson International Center for Scholars, October 14, 2008
 Discussion Meeting - Elkhan Nuriyev. International Institute for Strategic Studies, October 7, 2008
 Azerbaijan and the EU – Chances for a Strategic Partnership. DGAP, Monday September 22, 2008
 Azerbaijan and New Geopolitics of Eurasia. Euarasia Critic, July, 2008
 Azerbaijan's Geostrategic Role in the South Caucasus-Caspian Basin. Center for Russian, East European & Eurasian Studies, May 20, 2008
 Khojaly genocide forever remembered. Today's Zaman, February 27, 2008

References 

Think tanks based in Azerbaijan
2007 establishments in Azerbaijan
Research institutes established in 2007
Research institutes in Azerbaijan